Inteligo Financial Services S.A. is one of the first online banks of Poland. It was founded by David Putts and Andrzej Klesyk, two former McKinsey consultants, and Hasan Mustafa and Kyle Spicer, two former ABN AMRO Bank professionals, as an independent start-up and partnership with Bankgesellschaft Berlin.

Inteligo began operations on May 1, 2001, and acquired 150,000 customers in the first 12 months of operations, achieving 54% aided brand awareness.

Inteligo was the first in Europe to offer email money, patterned off PayPal. Inteligo was also first to offer secure mobile phone banking money transfer services, and real-time confirmations after ATM and POS transactions.

When Bankgesellschaft suffered a liquidity crisis following a fall in East Berlin real-estate prices, it forced a 100% sale of Inteligo to PKO BP in 2002.

External links 
 

Banks of Poland
Banks established in 2001
Polish companies established in 2001